Joachim Sørum (born 11 February 1979) is a Norwegian footballer.

Career
Born in Dokka, Sørum is a defender, and normally plays in the mid-defence.

He started his career in Nordre Land, and went on to Faaberg which changed its name to Lillehammer. He went to Hamarkameratene ahead of the 2002 season. He made his debut against Tromsdalen on 21 April the same year. The highlight of his career is probably his 2–0 goal in the home match against Rosenborg in 2004. He was loaned out to Nybergsund in 2008, and played there regularly in 2009 and 2010 after spending the pre-season training period in Hamarkameratene. In 2011, he returned home to Nordre Land.

References

1979 births
Living people
People from Nordre Land
Norwegian footballers
Hamarkameratene players
Nybergsund IL players
Association football defenders
Sportspeople from Innlandet